Exechopalpus is a genus of parasitic flies in the family Tachinidae. There are about five described species in Exechopalpus.

Species
These five species belong to the genus Exechopalpus:
 Exechopalpus dubitalis Malloch, 1930
 Exechopalpus fulvipes Malloch, 1930
 Exechopalpus nigripes Malloch, 1930
 Exechopalpus rufifemur Malloch, 1930
 Exechopalpus rufipalpus Macquart, 1847

References

Further reading

 
 
 
 

Tachinidae
Articles created by Qbugbot